The Rambouillet Agreement, formally the Interim Agreement for Peace and Self-Government in Kosovo, was a proposed peace agreement between the Federal Republic of Yugoslavia and a delegation representing the ethnic Albanian majority population of Kosovo. It was drafted by the North Atlantic Treaty Organization (NATO) and named for the Château de Rambouillet, where it was initially proposed in early 1999. Among other things, the accords called for 30,000 NATO peacekeeping troops in Kosovo; an unhindered right of passage for NATO troops on Yugoslav territory; and immunity for NATO and its agents to Yugoslav law. Yugoslavia's refusal to sign the accords was used by NATO to justify the 1999 bombing of Yugoslavia.

Proposed agreement 
The provisions of the agreement included:

 "Kosovo will have a president, prime minister, and government, an assembly, its own Supreme Court, constitutional court and other courts."
 "Kosovo will have the authority to make laws not subject to revision by Serbia or the Federal Republic of Yugoslavia, including levying taxes, instituting programs of economic, scientific, technological, regional and social development, conducting foreign relations within its area of responsibility in the same manner as a Republic."
 "Yugoslav army forces and Serb security forces will withdraw completely from Kosovo, except for a limited border guard force (active only within a 5 kilometer border zone)."
 "The parties invite NATO to deploy a military force (KFOR), which will be authorized to use necessary force to ensure compliance with the accords."
 "The international community will play a role in ensuring that these provisions are carried out through a Civilian Implementation Mission (CIM) appointed by NATO".
 "The Chief of the CIM has the authority to issue binding directives to the Parties on all important matters he sees fit, including appointing and removing officials and curtailing institutions."
 "Three years after the implementation of the Accords, an international meeting will be convened to determine a mechanism for a final settlement for Kosovo on the basis of the will of its People." 
 "NATO personnel shall enjoy, together with their vehicles, vessels, aircraft, and equipment, free and unrestricted passage and unimpeded access throughout the Federal Republic of Yugoslavia including associated airspace and territorial waters. This shall include, but not be limited to, the right of bivouac, maneuver, billet and utilization of any areas or facilities as required for support, training, and operations."
 "NATO is granted the use of airports roads, rails, and ports without payment of fees, duties, dues, tolls, or charges occasioned by mere use."
 "Yugoslavia and Kosovo shall, upon simple request, grant all telecommunications services, including broadcast services, needed for the Operation, as determined by NATO, This shall include the right to utilize such means and services as required to assure full ability to communicate and the right to use all of the electromagnetic spectrum for this purpose, free of cost."
 "In the conduct of the Operation, NATO may need to make improvements or modifications to certain infrastructure in the FRY, such as roads, bridges, tunnels, buildings, and utility systems."
 "NATO shall be immune from all legal process, whether civil, administrative, or criminal."
 "NATO personnel, under all circumstances and at all times, shall be immune from the Parties, jurisdiction in respect of any civil, administrative, criminal or disciplinary offenses which may be committed by them in the FRY."
 "NATO personnel shall be immune from any form of arrest, investigation, or detention by the authorities in the FRY."

Negotiations
The biggest problem for both sides was that the Albanians were unwilling to accept a solution that would retain Kosovo as part of Serbia, whilst the Serbs did not want to see the pre-1990 status quo restored, and they were implacably opposed to any international role in the governance of the province, including the offer of a face-saving measure wherein blue-helmeted UN peacekeeping troops would be used instead of NATO troops. To add to the farce, the NATO Contact Group countries were desperate to avoid having to make good on their threat of force—Greece and Italy were opposed to the idea. Consequently, when the talks failed to achieve an agreement by the original deadline of 19 February, they were extended by another month.

The two paragraphs above, however, are partially contradicted by the historical evidence. In particular, the statement by the co-chairmen Robin Cook and Hubert Védrine on 23 February 1999 that the negotiations "have led to a consensus" on substantial autonomy for Kosovo, including on mechanisms for free and fair elections to democratic institutions, for the governance of Kosovo, for the protection of human rights and the rights of members of national communities; and for the establishment of a fair judicial system". They went on to say that "a political framework is now in place" leaving the further work of finalizing "the implementation Chapters of the Agreement, including the modalities of the invited international civilian and military presence in Kosovo".

18 March 1999
In the end, on 18 March 1999, the Albanian, American and British delegation signed what became known as the 'Rambouillet Accords' while the Serbian and Russian delegations refused. The accords called for NATO administration of Kosovo as an autonomous province within Yugoslavia; a force of 30,000 NATO troops to maintain order in Kosovo; an unhindered right of passage for NATO troops on Yugoslav territory, including Kosovo; and immunity for NATO and its agents to Yugoslav law. In addition, NATO forces would have the right to use local roads, ports, railways, and airports without payment of duties, dues, tolls or charges, as well as the right to use the electromagnetic spectrum without payment. NATO would also have the right to requisition public facilities for its use free of cost. NATO forces would have the right to hire local personnel who upon employment with NATO would be exempt from local laws in respect to acts performed in their official capacity, national service obligations, local labor laws, and taxes on their salaries. Local infrastructure would be subjected to improvements or modifications to by NATO forces when deemed necessary to facilitate the mission. 
According to Tim Judah, the Serbian side used Annex B only later on as a reason for the failure of talks; at the time, the Serbs rejected any discussion of the involvement of foreign troops, let alone the extensive rights that would have been afforded them by Annex B.

Events proceeded rapidly after the failure at Rambouillet. The international monitors from the OSCE were withdrawn on 22 March for fear of the monitors' safety ahead of the anticipated bombing by NATO.  On 23 March, the Serbian assembly issued a resolution that condemned the withdrawal of the OSCE monitors, and accepted the principle of "autonomy" for Kosovo and non-military part of the agreement.

NATO leaders had expected that a brief bombing campaign would lead to Serb forces withdrawing from Kosovo, hence ending the humanitarian crisis; but Milošević may have gambled that his government and armed forces could withstand a few days of bombing without serious harm.

Reactions
In commentary released to the press, former United States Secretary of State Henry Kissinger declared that:

 The historian Christopher Clark supports this view, asserting that the terms of the 1914 Austro-Hungarian ultimatum to Serbia appear lenient compared to the NATO demands.

A former hand on the State Department's Yugoslavia desk, George Kenney, reported in May 1999 that a senior State Department official had briefed journalists off the record that "[we] deliberately set the bar higher than the Serbs could accept".

For the Serbs, signing the Rambouillet agreement would actually have been signing away all Serbian sovereignty over Kosovo. It was not even a "take it or leave it" proposition, as Secretary of State Albright emphasized back in February 1999; rather, it was "sign it or get bombed." There were, in fact, no negotiations at all, and no sovereign, independent state would have signed the Rambouillet agreement.

See also
1999 NATO bombing of Yugoslavia
Kumanovo Agreement
Ahtisaari Plan

References

Bibliography

Further reading

External links
Full text of Rambouillet Accords 
Beginning of discussion (May 14, 1999 to June 8, 1999, specifically) of Appendix B of the Rambouillet Treaty on H-Diplo, the academic diplomatic history forum
Goldstone Report
Minutes of the British inquiry in the Kosovo war
The Rambouillet Accord: A Declaration of War Disguised as a Peace Agreement, By Richard Becker, Western Regional Co- of the International Action Center

History of Kosovo
1999 in Serbia
Kosovo War
Kosovo peace process
NATO treaties
1999 documents
1999 in France